Handegard is a surname. Notable people with the surname include:

 John Handegard (born 1938), American ten-pin bowler
 Sigrid Brattabø Handegard (born 1963), Norwegian politician

Norwegian-language surnames